India House in Whitworth Street, Manchester, England, is a packing and shipping warehouse built in 1906 for Lloyd's Packing Warehouses Limited, which had, by merger, become the dominant commercial packing company in early-20th century Manchester. It is in the favoured Edwardian Baroque style and is steel-framed, with cladding of buff terracotta and red brick with buff terracotta dressings. It is a Grade II* listed building as of 3 October 1974.

Background
The building was designed by Harry S. Fairhurst, "the leading expert in the design of these advanced warehouses". Fairhurst was also responsible for Bridgewater House which stands opposite India House, and the neighbouring Lancaster House.
Fairhurst's huge buildings are "steel-framed and built to high-quality fireproof specifications".

It was constructed for Lloyd’s Packing Warehouses Limited and like many warehouses was built to a common design with steps to a raised ground floor with showroom and offices and the first floor contained more offices and waiting rooms for clients and sample and pattern rooms all decorated to impress customers. The working areas above were plain with large windows to allow in natural light. Orders were packed there and sent to the basement on hoists powered by Manchester's hydraulic power system and packed into bales using hydraulic presses before dispatch. The warehouse was lit by gas.

Noel Gallagher lived at India House in the 1990s and wrote Live Forever while in residence.

India House is part of a conservation area in Manchester city centre that reflects the historical importance of the textile industry in the city. The conservation area was designated by Manchester City Council in September 1974, and was bounded by Oxford Street, Portland Street, Abingdon Street, Bloom Street, Chorlton Street, Cobourg Street and the Piccadilly to Oxford Road railway viaduct. It was extended in June 1985 to include an area bounded by Whitworth Street, London Road and the above viaduct.

See also

Grade II* listed buildings in Greater Manchester
Listed buildings in Manchester-M1

References
Notes

Bibliography

External links

Commercial buildings in Manchester
Office buildings in Manchester
Warehouses in England
Grade II* listed buildings in Manchester
Grade II* listed commercial buildings
Grade II* listed industrial buildings
Grade II* listed office buildings
Edwardian architecture